This 1618 Battle of Gibraltar took place 24 June 1618 at the Strait of Gibraltar. it was one of several engagements during the Eighty Years' War between heavily armed Dutch traders and Spanish forces trying to block the ships from passing through the Straight of Gibraltar 

when 12 Dutch ships which had been hired by the Republic of Venice and were flying Venetian colors, under the command of Melcior van den Kerchove, fought their way through against 10 blockading Spanish ships, commanded by Miguel de Vidazabal. About 10 Dutch ships, commanded by Moy Lambert (although his full squadron consisted of 13 ships), stood aside during the battle. The battle lasted from 3pm til nightfall. The Venetians suffered 40 casualties and the Spanish 70. The Spanish account mentions only 10 ships under Venetian colors and 8 under Dutch.

References
 
 

Naval battles involving Spain
Naval battles involving the Dutch Republic
Action of 24 June 1618
1618 in Gibraltar
Naval battles involving the Republic of Venice